Constitution of the Virgin Islands may refer to:
 Constitution of the British Virgin Islands
 Constitution of the United States Virgin Islands